Microthauma is a genus of moths in the family Lyonetiidae.

Species
 Microthauma glycinella  Kuroko, 1964
 Microthauma lespedezella  Seksjaeva, 1990

External links
Lyonetiidae at Japanese Moths

Lyonetiidae